John Hacking may refer to:

 Jack Hacking (1897–1955), English footballer
 John Hacking (cricketer) (1909–1999), English cricketer
 John Jackson (hacker) (born 1994 or 1995), security researcher also known as John J. Hacking